Polyzosteria limbata, the Botany Bay cockroach is an insect found in south eastern Australia.

References

Cockroaches
Insects of Australia
Insects described in 1838